Ricardo PLC is a British publicly listed company named after its founder, Sir Harry Ricardo, originally incorporated and registered as Engine Patents Ltd. in 1915.  Ricardo is a global engineering, environmental and strategic consultancy, operating across a range of market sectors. Since 1919 the headquarters have been at Shoreham-by-Sea, West Sussex.  Ricardo develops engines, transmissions, vehicle systems, intelligent transportation systems (ITS) and hybrid & electric systems in addition to providing environmental and strategic consultancy services.

Introduction
Ricardo activities cover a range of market sectors including passenger car, commercial vehicle, rail, defence, motorsport, motorcycle, off-highway, marine, clean energy and power generation and government.  Its client list includes transportation original equipment manufacturers, supply chain organisations, energy companies, financial institutions and government agencies.

As well as the Shoreham UK headquarters, there are technical centres in Royal Leamington Spa, Cambridge, Chicago, Detroit, Aachen, Schwäbisch Gmünd (Germany), Prague, Coriano (Rimini, italy) and regional offices in Shanghai, Yokohama, Seoul, New Delhi, and Moscow.

Historical overview
Harry (later Sir Harry) Ricardo was born in London in 1885 and was educated at Rugby and Cambridge where he studied at Trinity College.  The first internal combustion engined cars were made by Daimler and Benz in the year of his birth and in his childhood days he was clearly highly influenced by these new forms of transport.  He was renowned for his research into the problem of knock in engines; the results of his work on fuel and reducing fuel consumption assisted Alcock and Brown to cross the Atlantic for the first time by aircraft.  Over the years, he was responsible for significant developments in the design of piston engines for a number of applications and derivatives of his original designs are still in production.

He was elected Fellow of the Royal Society (FRAeS) in 1929 and in 1948 was knighted in recognition of his services to the internal combustion engine industry. He died in 1974 at the age of 89.

From his earliest days, Harry Ricardo had a fascination for engines.  He had designed and built many small engines in his youth including, at the age of 17, an engine to pump water at the family home in Sussex.  In 1906 he filed his first engine design patent while still a student at Cambridge.  In 1908 'The Two-Stroke Engine Company' started to manufacture and sell a car – the Dolphin – fitted with the same novel engine he had designed and patented earlier as a student at Cambridge.   This also found its way into many of the Shoreham-built fishing boats until almost every fisherman had a Dolphin engine in his boat; they were suited to prolonged low speed operation and proved extremely reliable.

In 1915 Harry Ricardo formed Engine Patents Ltd, the company which is today known as Ricardo plc. In this year he was contacted by the Royal Naval Air Service (RNAS) to help with the design of a device to manoeuvre battle tanks into position aboard railway wagons.  In fact, he discovered numerous problems with the tank engine itself that he was able to help with.  For example, the existing engine, a Daimler 105 bhp sleeve-valve gasoline engine, had a poor lubrication system and many failures occurred as a result.  Its purely reciprocating sleeves supplied a large quantity of oil into the exhaust port and the tank's location was revealed by the pall of blue smoke.  Harry designed a new 4-stroke crosshead-type engine producing 150 bhp with no visible smoke.

Around 8000 engines were produced to power the tanks.  Many more of these engines found applications powering generators in workshops, hospitals and camps.  The success of this venture yielded £30,000 in royalties and led to Harry Ricardo being able to buy the land and set up the company on its present site in 1919.

Technologies that shaped the company's first 100 years
Here is a selection of Ricardo-inspired developments marking advances in land, sea and air environments. (Ref 4 covers all of these in more detail)

1906: The Dolphin motor car

Started during Harry Ricardo's student days in Cambridge, the Dolphin project for a range of passenger cars was technically interesting, but ended in commercial collapse. Ricardo himself was not involved in owning or running the company, but its failure steered the young engineer away from manufacturing and towards research and development. Ricardo, while still at Cambridge, had patented an innovative split-cycle two-stroke layout, with the first cylinder pumping the compressed fuel-air mixture into the second, where the combustion took place. The combustion chamber was advanced, too, allowing a degree of charge stratification.   His cousin, Ralph, who had the idea of starting the Dolphin motor car works in Shoreham, and was the main partner, centred the car's propulsion system on Harry's engine, as options for internal combustion engines in the early 1900s were very limited.

Both two and four-cylinder versions were built, along with a large car to suit the bigger engine. Eight of the large cars were built, mainly for family members, but only a single prototype of the smaller machine. This was used by Harry Ricardo for his personal transport for the next ten years.
The intention had always been to offer the engine to other vehicle builders, but though the car business struggled, a measure of success came from an unexpected quarter. The fishermen at Shoreham harbour were so impressed with a prototype boat fitted with the unit that they all quickly adopted this engine in their boats. Particularly appreciated was the unit's smooth and steady low idle speed, which was perfect for their coastal fishing requirements.

Though the Two-Stroke Car Company closed in 1909, the engine design lived on as a 700 cc, 12 hp unit powering the Lloyd Vox light car, of which 100 were sold in the run-up to the First World War.

1915: The Mark V Tank Engine

The background to Harry Ricardo's development of a new engine for the Mk V tank is well known. Top military officials had long been divided over the merits of these so-called land ships, which were originally designed to allow an advance in the face of machine-gun fire from the enemy lines. It fell in the end to the Admiralty, with the strong support of Winston Churchill, to make the case for tanks, and by 1915 the go-ahead had been given for a limited development programme – albeit with a low priority in the use of scarce resources such as aluminium and high-grade fuel.
The early tanks suffered from many problems, from uncertainty about battlefield tactics and communication, to unreliability, tricky manoeuvring and the tendency to emit thick smoke under acceleration. The element of surprise had been sacrificed, and the tanks needed significant improvement if they were to influence the course of the war. Through his contacts in government circles, Harry Ricardo was entrusted with the design of a wholly new engine for the 28-tonne machines and the creation of a network of factories to build the units in large numbers.

More than 8000 units were built and saw service in everything from tanks and transports to railway engines, boats and stationary applications.

1919: Turbulent head

The side-valve engines of the immediate post WW1 era were inefficient, and the intrinsic limitations of their combustion chamber geometries prevented them from achieving high enough Compression ratios to develop reasonable power outputs. Only the more complex and much less reliable overhead valve engines could manage respectable power figures; these were generally confined to sports and expensive luxury cars.

Harry Ricardo's contribution was to understand the combustion process and develop a cylinder head that retained the simplicity and the low cost of the side valve layout, but which rethought the shape of the combustion chamber to provide both the greater compression required for power, and the improved gas mixing that he realised was essential for stable combustion and the avoidance of damaging detonation. This he achieved with an asymmetric profile to the combustion chamber which used a squish effect to induce turbulence in the gases above the rising piston, compressing them into the chamber to one side, where they were ignited by the spark plug.

The quickly patented design was simple and very effective, giving low-cost side-valve engines the performance of the much pricier OHV units of that day. The development was immediately popular with a wide variety of vehicle makers, from Vauxhall and Triumph to Harley-Davidson, Hillman-Humber, Ford, Austin and many others. Soon it was to be found on almost every side-valve engine in production and, charged at around 37 pence per engine, earned Ricardo substantial royalties until improved fuel quality eventually allowed overhead valves to take over in the 1950s.

1931: Indirect injection Diesel – the Comet chamber

Inspired though it was, the Comet diesel cylinder head, which provided Ricardo with much of its royalty income from the 1930s until almost the turn of the century, was not a single, isolated invention. As befitted Harry Ricardo's ever-inventive turn of mind, Comet was a concept that evolved and improved continuously right through to the 1990s, keeping pace with market and legislative demands and adapting itself to new vehicle categories. Invariably, at least one of the many single-cylinder test engines in the Shoreham laboratories would be evaluating a new variant on the Comet principle.

The original Comet Mk1, which first appeared in AEC's engine for London bus fleets in the early 1930s, was followed by improved versions giving more economy, better cold starting – for some while a weak point of Comet engines – and more power. By 1936,
18 UK companies and 14 foreign firms had taken up licences for the technology: among these organisations were well-known brand names such as Citroën, Berliet, MAN, Armstrong Siddeley and de Havilland Aircraft. Fiat was quick to sign up, after its technical director was given a demonstration by AEC and London's bus operator.

Development progressed apace, with the principle spreading into other sectors such as agriculture, where the Standard-Triumph 23 diesel proved a big success in Massey Ferguson tractors. Comet diesels also powered successive generations of Land Rovers and a large number of Peugeots, including the big-selling 403. By the 1960s, Fiat was the biggest licensee. Japan and India were fertile ground, too, and by the time the Comet patents began to expire in the 1970s, nearly all diesel cars on the market were using the system. One fresh application even appeared just after the millennium.

1934: Citroen Rosalie – the world's first production diesel passenger car

André Citroën was a pioneer in many more ways than just the front wheel drive, streamlining and unitary construction he is best known for today. In the late 1920s, he had been quick to appreciate the potential of the diesel engine for passenger cars and, having followed Ricardo's work with AEC on the London buses fitted with the innovative Comet cylinder head, he visited Ricardo at Shoreham in 1933 to discuss possible co-operation on a 1.7-litre unit suitable for a medium-sized model. With Citroën engineers working alongside Ricardo specialists at Shoreham, progress was swift, and soon prototypes were running on the road, reportedly to the "complete satisfaction" of M. Citroën.

The model was homologated under the name Rosalie in late 1934 and a pre-production run of some 50 or 75 units were loaned to taxi drivers for in-service evaluation. When these were sold, the Rosalie became the first-ever production diesel passenger car to be marketed commercially, pre-dating the Mercedes 260D by nearly a year, though historians continue to dispute the actual figures.

The Rosalie's career would have been more glorious but for the death of André Citroën in 1935, the subsequent financial difficulties of his company and the German occupation of France: in the event, several hundred were built, along with a much larger number of engines for vans and other commercial vehicles. As a light and highly efficient family car, the Rosalie earned great praise from the French press and set the template for the models that today account for more than half of all sales across Europe.

1936: Flying Spray

With gasoline-fuelled aero engines having advanced rapidly during WW1 and the 1920s, many engineers – including some in the military – began investigating the diesel principle in the hope that similar or even greater potential might be found. At the behest of the Air Ministry, Ricardo had been working on a variety of engines for both aircraft and airships, and in 1929 he received a request to work with Rolls-Royce to convert a Kestrel V12, at that time the standard engine for fighter aircraft, to diesel operation.

To facilitate the change, Ricardo also removed the Kestrel's four overhead valves per cylinder and replaced them with a single sleeve valve system, a move entailing a very considerable redesign. The first results were very encouraging, with more power and lower specific fuel consumption than the gasoline version. This attracted the attention of Captain George Eyston, one of a trio of racing drivers who established successively higher land and water speed records in a variety of machinery. Eyston had been holder of the diesel speed record in a specially prepared saloon car, also with a Ricardo engine (an AEC bus engine with the Comet combustion system), and his later 1934 record breaker had been powered by the gasoline version of the Kestrel: logic suggested that the RR/D diesel Kestrel in the same car would be a good combination.

And so it proved, with the Flying Spray taking the world diesel speed record at Bonneville in May 1936, at  – a record that stood until 1950.

1936: Rolls-Royce Crecy

Sir Henry Royce, co-founder of Rolls-Royce, lived close to Harry Ricardo on the Sussex coast, and as early as 1931 they discussed the possibility of a new high power-to-weight aero engine for use in interceptor aircraft. The requirement would lead to some of the most elaborate piston engines ever designed. Ricardo had been working on a two-stroke diesel single-cylinder experimental engine, the E.65. The Rolls-Royce engine would be a V12 model with direct injection, stratified charge, sleeve valve with uniflow scavenging, and high-pressure supercharger. Control was entirely via fuel metering, with no conventional throttle. The fuel was later changed to petrol, leaving the Crecy with a unique combination of features for a petrol engine.

Harry Ricardo saw the two-stroke aero engine as a logical bridge between conventional piston engines and the future generation of gas turbine jets; he was able to point to an estimated 50 percent advantage in power and 15 percent in fuel consumption compared to the ubiquitous Rolls-Royce Merlin. However the development of the powerful Rolls-Royce Griffon and Napier Sabre (also a sleeve-valve design) on the one hand, and the Rolls-Royce Welland and de Havilland Goblin jet engines on the other, meant there was no need for an interim piston engine and, in December 1944, the project was dropped, much to Ricardo's regret. Some of the know-how would later be exploited in other programmes.

1938: Alfa Romeo V16 racing engine

In the intensely nationalistic pre-war atmosphere prevailing in Italy, Alfa Corse, under the leadership of Enzo Ferrari, was impelled to compete, and its Spanish-born head of R&D, Wifredo Ricart, turned to Harry Ricardo for technical advice. The supercharged Tipo 162 3-litre V16 that emerged from this collaboration was destined never to race, let alone be tested in anger, yet it stands as one of the most advanced competition engines of the era, and was influential in the design of many subsequent racing engines, including Alfa's post-war 158 and 159 and BRM's own ultra-complex V16.

Together, Ricart and Ricardo laid down a wide-angle V16, with 135 degrees between the banks; it was to be a high-revving unit, with square bore and stroke dimensions – an unusual feature at the time. Two-stage supercharging boosted the early testbed engines to 490 hp at 7800 rev/min, with the expectation of reaching 560 hp with an increase in engine speed to 8200 rev/min. These were the highest specific power figures ever achieved – with the exception of Mercedes-Benz's just-released 1.5-litre V8.

Though enough components had been made for six examples of this engine, Italy's entry into the war put an end to all further development. Yet there is one important legacy of this remarkable engine: Ricart planned a roadgoing coupé, the Tipo 163, using this engine centrally mounted in non-supercharged form. This, it could be argued, would be the blueprint for the mid-engined supercars that today dominate the high performance market.

1941: Barostat

Although Harry Ricardo was deeply committed to the philosophy of sophisticated gasoline-fuelled piston engines for Britain's World War Two fighter aircraft, he was equally aware of the potential of the gas turbine engine, and had already helped Frank Whittle with the combustion chamber and burner design of his prototype jet engine. Ricardo workshops fabricated the 90-odd burner-atomizers used in the engine, which was already undergoing testing. The other problem concerning Whittle was the question of the fuel supply to the jet engine and how the pressure in the system could be stabilised as the aircraft climbed and the ambient atmospheric pressure varied. No solution had yet been found, so Ricardo was asked to assist. He proposed a device, a relief valve subsequently named 'Barostat', which automatically reduced the pressure in the fuel lines as the aircraft gained altitude. This relieved the pilot of having to continuously adjust the throttle settings, and avoided the risk of the engine overspeeding.

The experimental Gloster E.28/39, built to test Whittle's engine, made the UK's first jet-powered flight in May 1941, and subsequent development led ultimately to the Gloster Meteor, the twin-jet fighter that entered RAF service in 1944. During the development of Whittle's engine, Harry Ricardo had declared that he would waive any patent royalties on devices connected with the jet engine. Whittle himself was fiercely protective of his design, and both were unhappy when the General Electric Company in the US, which had been allowed to copy the engine, itself patented the unit and the Ricardo Barostat.

1951: Fell locomotive

The brainchild of Lt-Col LFR Fell, who convinced his friend Harry Ricardo to undertake its development, the 4-8-4 Fell locomotive had one of the most complex drivetrains ever seen in the railway industry.

Fell's intention had been to sidestep the energy conversion losses being encountered in the diesel-electric locomotives then coming into service. To this end, he devised an all-mechanical power transmission system which provided the required variable gearing and which was claimed to be lighter than a standard arrangement. No fewer than four 500 hp V12 Paxman-Ricardo diesel engines were specified, along with an additional pair of AEC-Ricardo marine diesels, whose job was to power the Superchargers feeding the four main engines. Two large banks of radiators and fans ensured cooling for all six engines, and twin cabs and duplicated controls enabled the locomotive to operate in either direction.

The four main engines were coupled hydraulically to the central gearbox incorporating three differentials. The system allowed the driver to employ any number of the main engines, depending on the load and the speed required. The cleverness of the arrangement was in the way that the supercharge pressure delivered by the two auxiliary engines fell progressively as the speed of the main engines rose, thus ensuring constant horsepower over the whole rpm range. The locomotive entered trial service on the London to Derby line in 1951 but fell victim to rationalisation within the newly nationalised rail network. Nevertheless, Ricardo's interest in rail transport continued, and the company has advised on many rail and rolling stock programmes in the years that have followed.

1959: Combustion photography

Harry Ricardo's famously vivid 1931 lecture to the Royal Society of Arts, in which he invited his audience to "accompany me inside the cylinder of a diesel engine", passionately described the process of diesel combustion, in great detail. Yet for all its drama, it was largely a work of his brilliant imagination and deduction, for at that time no one had been able to see inside a working cylinder, whether gasoline or diesel.

Early tests with wool tufts, Stroboscopes and tiny windows had given some indications of the phenomena inside, but it was only in 1959, with an article in New Scientist, that Ricardo engineers Hempson and Scott were able to illustrate their argument with a sequence of colour photographs of actual combustion taking place. Taken using a series of mirrors and a Fastax camera running at 16,000 frames per second, this was the first of a series of major steps in advancing the understanding of the combustion process and the formation of pollutants within the cylinder. Crucially, engineers were no longer blind when it came to picturing combustion events, helping combustion chamber design to progress from an art to a science.

"Transparent" engines of different descriptions and increasing complexity later evolved and could be used to evaluate different phenomena such as swirl, tumble and squish, and to study flame propagation in minute detail. Yet the biggest step of all came with the development of digital modelling of the engine and the gas flows within it. Now, immensely sophisticated CFD (Computational Fluid Dynamics) simulations and visualisations guide today's engine designers, and any engine configuration can be simulated, and its performance predicted, with a high degree of confidence in its accuracy, and without the need to build any hardware whatsoever.

1966: Jensen FF

Tractor magnate Harry Ferguson had long been convinced that four-wheel drive would provide important safety benefits on the road, as well as in the rough. Having failed to persuade British car makers to adopt his system, he and a core group of engineers developed a Formula 1 car to prove the point.

The P99 was driven to a single Formula 1 win, in 1961, by Stirling Moss, and though Ferguson died in the same year, the principles were developed further and applied to an innovative luxury coupé – the 1966 Jensen FF. Powered by a Chrysler V8 engine driving all four wheels through a three-speed automatic transmission, the elegantly styled GT also incorporated the aircraft-derived Dunlop Maxaret anti-skid braking system, leading it to be declared the world's safest car.

Despite its status as the first ever four-wheel drive road car and the first to feature ABS, the FF's high price kept it out of reach of many buyers; it was the similarly stylish but simpler and less expensive rear-drive Interceptor that stole the public imagination, and only 320 examples of the FF were made.

Ferguson's company, by then known as FF Developments, went on to provide valuable 4WD expertise to rally teams during the Group B era, and pioneered the viscous coupling unit, which found widespread application in road vehicles such as the Ford Sierra XR4x4, and Sapphire Cosworth. The company was acquired by Ricardo in 1994 and forms the kernel of the Ricardo group's driveline operations in the UK.

1968: Recycle Diesel

The title of this device does not point to a capacity to re-use diesel fuel, nor to run on other forms of recycled fuels. The 'recycle' in its title refers to the unit's ability to blend a proportion of its exhaust gas with fresh oxygen (carried on board as HTP) and diesel fuel to enable underwater operation for up to 12 hours at a stretch.

The requirement for the Recycle Diesel arose because the growing military and civil interest in oceanographic research had highlighted the poor performance of submarines using pure electric power units with lead-acid batteries.

The US Navy specification for the device included simple controls and automated operation by one person, along with a 30 hp output – sufficient to give a 20-tonne submarine a speed of 8 knots. The closed-loop nature of the engine's operation required precise matching of the quantities of diesel fuel and oxygen injected into the flow of exhaust gases, themselves accurately controlled for volume, temperature and water content. Compressed air was used to start the Perkins four-cylinder diesel so as to avoid the risk of an explosive mixture of oxygen, and the finished power pack had three times the power to mass of batteries and could power a 10-tonne submersible for 16 hours at 6 knots.

Recycle even appeared on the British television programme Tomorrow's World but it eventually lost momentum within the US military and was overtaken by newer developments.

1970: Noise & vibration

Ricardo opened its first dedicated noise control facilities – an anechoic cell and a handful of staff – in the early 1970s when drive-by noise legislation was soon to be introduced.

Today, Ricardo's NVH work has expanded into areas of subjective noise and sound quality as well as having to meet legislative exterior noise limits.

That trend has continued, and over the years the number of test cells and staff has steadily risen. Sound quality has featured strongly in recent work for Jaguar and McLaren – the latter featured on a television programme – as well as for BMW on the Mini Cooper S.

Noise simulations of different proposed grand prix engine types have also been made, comparing an in-line four and a V6 against high-revving, naturally aspirated V8s. No hardware was built: all was accomplished using WAVE software.

1975: Turbocharged Opel 2100D

This 1970s-era Opel Rekord was a Ricardo prototype based on a standard production vehicle, and served as a technology demonstrator. Under the bonnet was an important new type of engine – a turbo diesel – which Ricardo specialists were confident held significant potential for the future.

The volume of diesel cars in circulation in 1970 was very low, perhaps because the vehicles themselves were generally slow to start, noisy, smoky, and with sluggish performance, they tended to be confined to Europe's taxi ranks, rather than appealing to the mainstream buyer.

Ricardo's aim with the turbo diesel demonstrator was to match the performance of the gasoline car of the same 2.1 litre displacement; this was achieved, with a 40 percent increase in power over the standard model. The twin fuel crises of the 1970s jolted Europe's carmakers into action, and by the end of the decade Volkswagen had a diesel Golf, Mercedes-Benz had developed its five-cylinder turbo diesel, and Peugeot was first to market with its 604 turbo diesel.

1981: HRCC VW Jetta

More of a working research vehicle than a technology demonstrator, the 1981 VW Jetta prototype was part of Ricardo's HRCC programme to improve the fuel economy of gasoline engines through a number of measures, including a much higher compression ratio, the ability to run on very lean air-fuel mixtures, and the tolerance of lower- octane fuels.

The HRCC (High Ratio Compact Chamber) Jetta engine benefited from the lessons learned in nearly five years of fundamental research and testing of lean burn concepts on single- cylinder test engines. In its gasoline form, it claimed a thermal efficiency some 10 percent better than the standard engine, along with an improvement in actual economy of five percent. The HRCC cylinder head had different combustion chamber geometry and relocated spark plug and valves; the inlet system was revised, too, as was the camshaft profile. In combination with reshaped pistons, it produced a compression ratio of 13:1 – extremely high for the time – yet could run on lower octane fuel than its conventional counterpart.

The Jetta was said to have demonstrated good driveability, often a drawback with lean-burn vehicles, and though its hydrocarbon emissions were higher than the donor car's, it claimed lower NOx and CO outputs.

This programme attracted the attention of the US EPA, which commissioned a study of a methanol-fuelled version of the HRCC engine, again concluding that there was potential in the design.

1982: Chevrolet Diesel

After the shock of the double fuel crises of the 1970s, US manufacturers took action to stem the fuel thirst of their large and heavy vehicles. Some rushed to import smaller models, others to de-rate the big gasoline V8s that had long dominated the market. However, some of the moves backfired: many of the hastily created diesels proved tricky to drive, unreliable or even self-destructive, giving diesel a bad name in the US market that took decades to shake off.

Yet, even after that initial fuel hysteria had subsided and the market returned to normality, GM realised that properly delivered diesel power would soon be an essential part of the product offer of any major producer, especially when it came to pick-up trucks and other dual purpose vehicles. Accordingly, GM commissioned Ricardo in the US to assist with a fresh start on diesel, and for the 1982 model year Chevrolet appeared with a new 6.2-litre V8 offering upwards of 130 hp.

Ricardo's adaptation of the existing all-iron gasoline V8 featured the company's famous Comet cylinder heads and indirect injection using mechanical injectors and a rotary pump; with identical engine mounts and bellhousing bolt patterns to the gasoline version, the diesel was a straight swap and easily integrated on the production line.

Evidence of the efficiency of the design came with a 20/24 mpg EPA city/highway rating, and the solidity of the unit was clear when it was chosen to power the Hummer H1. The engine remained in production until 2000, when it was replaced by the Duramax series.

1986: Voyager aircraft

The Voyager aircraft set out to fly non-stop right around the world without refuelling. Ricardo was one of the companies assisting designer and pilot Richard Rutan in the five-year project, reconfiguring the twin Teledyne Continental engines for maximum efficiency. Mounted front and rear of the central fuselage carrying the two crew, the engines had different roles: one was to be operated intermittently at full throttle for best specific fuel consumption during climb, while the other would run continuously for cruise. The key to in-flight economy, said Voyager officials, was to keep the engines running as lean as possible.

With a dry weight of just 1250 kg, but carrying over 3100 kg of fuel, the composite construction aircraft was optimised for maximum lift and minimum drag; with a maximum airspeed of less than 200 km/h, it was vulnerable to headwinds and turbulence, often forcing the crew to change altitude in search of calmer conditions. Yet the calculations proved accurate, even if the fuel flow readings in flight were misleading: on 23 December 1986, nine days after taking off, Voyager touched down again at Edwards AFB in California, having flown more than 40,000 km at altitudes up to 20,000 ft (6000 m). In its tanks remained just 56 litres of fuel.

1996: Ferrari 456

Ferrari commissioned FFD-Ricardo in the US to develop an automatic version of the 456GT four-seater coupé, preserving the V12's famous driving experience but offering ease of use. Ricardo configured a four-speed torque converter transmission from scratch, using bought-in internal components and with a novel layout dictated by the six-speed manual Ferrari's rear transaxle gearbox architecture. The propeller shaft from the front-mounted V12 drove the torque converter mounted ahead of the rear axle line, while the gearbox was positioned behind and fed its output forward to the differential.

Labelled GTA when it was launched in 1996, the automatic 456 drew powerful praise from an unexpected quarter – enthusiasts' magazines. "One of the best auto setups on any fast GT", said Car Magazine, revelling in a transmission that allowed the engine to rev to 7000 rev/min before shifting to the next ratio.

2006: JCB Dieselmax

Ricardo had previously assisted JCB with the design of the new 444 generation of diesel engines for its range of construction machines.  Later, JCB and Ricardo decided to make a bid for the world diesel land speed record using the Ricardo-designed JCB engines.

Ricardo simulations pointed to a power requirement of 1500 hp to reach the 350 mph (563 km/h) target, and with a detailed knowledge of the engine's every component, Ricardo's diesel performance specialists worked out that, with a double engine arrangement, that target could be within reach.

It was a tall order to boost each engine from 125 hp to six times that output: laid on their sides and fitted with dry sumps, each four-cylinder, 5 litre engine ran at 6 bar boost, with intercooling and water injection; soon they were giving 600 hp. A number of bespoke components were required, including a solid billet crankshaft, competition fuel injectors and pistons and modified cam profiles.

2008: Foxhound & military vehicles

Developed by Ricardo under the name Ocelot, the British Army's Foxhound is a radical take on the formula of a light-protected patrol vehicle. Changing military requirements such as peacekeeping duties and patrolling in potentially hostile areas were exposing the limitations of existing designs based on medium-duty 4x4 platforms; in particular, improved protection was needed against roadside bombs and IEDs.

Among the requirements of the military specification were a maximum weight of 7.5 tonnes (to enable airlifting by a Chinook helicopter) and a width of no more than 2.1 m. The architecture developed by Ricardo and its partner Force Protection Europe is a radical one: the hull is V-shaped to deflect bomb blasts, all the powertrain and mechanical components are housed inside, and interchangeable rear 'pods' allow it to do duty as a flatbed pick-up, ambulance or reconnaissance vehicle. The 3.2 litre six cylinder engine drives all four wheels, and even if an entire wheel and suspension corner is blown off, the vehicle can continue.

Ease of access for the maintenance or repair of the mechanical elements is a high priority: within the hull the engine, transmission, exhaust and air intake are all mounted on a single frame, allowing the assembly to be removed as a whole and replaced by another in less than an hour.

Ricardo has manufactured a substantial batch of Foxhounds for the British Ministry of Defence and the experience gained in the programme has fed back into subsequent projects for military vehicles.

2009: McLaren M838T

In 2009, McLaren selected Ricardo as a development and manufacturing partner for a new engine for road car applications.  Ricardo – through FFD – had previously supported McLaren by supplying the production transmission for the original McLaren F1 road car.

The technical demands were challenging: the engine had to be the most powerful, the cleanest and the most efficient in its class. Just 18 months were available between design start and pilot production. With the deployment of world-class software tools, the basic configuration of the engine was soon established — a 3.8 litre twin-turbo V8 — and the use of design for assembly techniques helped avoid tricky stages in the assembly process.

With a total of over 400 Ricardo staff contributing to the project, both the engine and the state-of-the-art manufacturing facility at the Ricardo HQ in Shoreham were complete by the January 2011 deadline, and by the end of the year 1500 engines had been delivered. True to the specification, these engines did combine remarkable power – 600 hp – in relation to their CO2 emissions of just 279 g/km. Power has subsequently been raised first to 625 hp and then to 650, and McLaren has since increased its contract to 5000 engines a year.

2011: Ricardo co-operation with Jaguar Land Rover

For as long as it has existed, Ricardo has maintained consulting agreements with the major automakers, engine builders and government organisations of the day. These agreements continue to prove of great value to company managements requiring consultancy and technical advice.

The special working relationship with Jaguar Land Rover was announced in November 2011 and relates to product development geared towards delivering the best value. This agreement, announced the two companies, would enable selected programmes to be delivered to market as quickly as possible. Two examples of key programmes with active Ricardo support are the four-cylinder gasoline versions of the Jaguar XJ and XF luxury cars for the Chinese market, and the all-wheel drive derivatives of these same models, aimed at buyers in the North American snowbelt states. Ricardo has been able to support Jaguar Land Rover in a period of exceptionally rapid expansion and model development.

Further examples of Ricardo support for Jaguar Land Rover include the manual transmission version of the new Jaguar F-Type sports coupé and convertible, and their four-wheel drive editions. The benefits are mutual: Jaguar Land Rover has been able to bring more products to market in a shorter time and to a world- class standard, and the collaboration has led to shared expertise in key engineering and programme management domains.

2011: TorqStor Flywheel energy storage

The storing of energy in a fast-spinning flywheel has a natural appeal to engineers, promising maximum efficiency because there are no wasteful energy conversions required – the system is entirely mechanical. In 2011, Ricardo announced an important breakthrough in its pioneering Kinergy (the forerunner of TorqStor) high-speed flywheel project, introducing a magnetic coupling and gearing system to allow energy to be transferred to and from the flywheel directly through the containment wall holding the flywheel in its vacuum. This gives much better efficiency than using a mechanical shaft spinning at flywheel speed, which can be up to 60,000 rev/min, and is also able to provide a step-down to much lower speeds to make that energy more accessible.

The Kinergy concept, rated at 960 kJ, was a feature of the Flybus mechanical hybrid project led by Torotrak and including Optare and Allison Transmission. Demonstrating the effectiveness of flywheel systems for energy saving where the duty cycles are regular and repeated, Ricardo also showed the system in the HFX excavator in 2013; the company estimated a fuel saving of 10 percent, with more possible in a wheel-loader application.

Further applications have been explored in a variety of fields, including diesel trains. Ricardo, Artemis Intelligent Power and Bombardier are collaborating on the DDflyTrain research project to use the next-generation TorqStor flywheel system to bring regenerative braking, previously only available on electric trains, to diesel-hydraulic units. In recognition of TorqStor's potential for simple and cost-effective energy saving through hybridisation, the system was selected by the SAE World Congress for its 2014 Tech Award. A Ricardo-led research project in conjunction with the UK Department for Transport highlighted technology upgrade options for the rail network's diesel fleet, and the company is working with Bombardier and Artemis to integrate Ricardo TorqStor flywheel energy storage to allow brake energy recovery in diesel rolling stock.

2015: Rail & marine engineering

Other Ricardo rail industry projects have included an assessment of the viability of using liquefied natural gas instead of diesel fuel for the Canadian National Railway, the design and development of safety-critical electronic control systems, and collaboration with Scomi Rail of Malaysia on the development of monorail driveline technologies. A major step came in the first quarter of 2015 with the acquisition of Lloyd's Register Rail and the formation of a separate Ricardo Rail business unit.

In the marine area, Ricardo expertise has been applied to everything from small outboard motors and stern drives, to large 8 MW 16-cylinder diesels; novel engine concepts promise efficiency levels close to 60 percent, and computer modelling of complete ship propulsion systems is able to calculate the likely benefits of competing energy storage technologies and give return-on-investment predictions. One programme identified, and rectified, the deck vibration issues affecting a 55-ft luxury motor cruiser.

BMW C600 maxi scooter

Ricardo, having successfully collaborated with BMW on the development of the upgraded four-cylinder K1200 sports bike in 2008 and the six-cylinder K1600 luxury tourer in 2011, was chosen as development partner for the new maxi scooter.

Part of Ricardo's brief was to visit the large number of outside suppliers to the project to ensure that manufacturing was up to BMW's high standards. On a more technical level, a 270-degree crank angle was selected for the parallel twin engine in order to give it a more potent exhaust note, reminiscent of a 90-degree V twin. The scooter went through its early project gateways based solely on analysis and simulation results.

Clean energy

Major energy sector programmes that Ricardo has undertaken in recent years include engineering and analysis support for a Samsung Heavy Industries' 7 MW offshore wind turbine, the development of a reduced-cost and more robust solar collector and engine generator, and drivetrain technology benchmarking for a major wind power equipment manufacturer.

In addition, a major study for the UK National Grid on grid balancing through the charging of electric vehicle fleets gained widespread coverage, and in late 2014 Ricardo acquired PPA Energy to significantly upgrade its capabilities across the sector.

Taxibot

With the boom in air travel at the beginning of this century came a steep rise in aviation emissions – and not just in the air. The increase in aircraft movements has meant an even steeper jump in ground-level emissions as planes manoeuvre and taxi under their own power before waiting for their takeoff slot.

The finding that the average passenger jet aircraft consumes over 477 litres of fuel while taxiing led Israeli Aerospace Industries (IAI) to investigate a ground handling tractor capable of towing the aircraft to its takeoff position, where the main engines would then be started. This would not only save fuel, emissions and ground- level noise, but would also reduce the amount of ground-level engine running, where debris ingestion is a major risk.

IAI had a concept for a semi-robotic tug – Taxibot – which clamped around the aircraft's nosewheel and was controlled remotely by the pilot, just as if he or she was taxiing the plane in the normal way. Ricardo refined the concept, adding a third axle and an improved control system; a key step was to use the aircraft's brakes for slowing down.

Ricardo built the tug unit and a test trailer which replicated the load of a Boeing 747 aircraft, and later a retired 747/200 was used to further refine the feel of the system, as experienced by the pilot. IAI has since been working with Airbus at Toulouse and, more recently, Taxibot has been under evaluation at Frankfurt Airport and has been certified by Boeing for the 737.

Some additional notable projects

The draught-sensing three-point linkage used by tractors.  Ricardo's innovation was to automate it so that it only operated when the vehicle was moving.
Investigations into the Stirling engine for fuel-efficiency – commissioned by the U.S. Department of Energy in 1978.
Direct fuel-injection systems for aircraft and automobile engines.
About 1990 Ricardo undertook the development of an automatic layshaft transmission as part of an integrated power-train control system.
Transmissions for motorsport, notably the gearbox for the Audi R8 used in the 24 Hours of Le Mans
Improving the BMW K1200 series motorcycle engines which were subsequently fitted to the BMW Motorrad K1300S, K1300GT and K1300R models.
Executing the complete design of the six cylinder motor for the BMW Motorrad BMW K1600GT and K1600GTL, and the design and manufacture of its transmission, under contract to BMW.
Development of the BMW midsize scooter C400 X and C400 GT. New single-cylinder ICE Power unit with 350 ccm displacement and design of complete vehicle layout including integration, validation and industrialisation.
An engine capable of switching between two-stroke and four-stroke cycles is the result of a collaboration between Ricardo, Denso, Jaguar Land-Rover and the Centre for Automotive Engineering at the University of Brighton. The engine is claimed to improve fuel economy by up to 25%.
The company collaborated with Xtrac by assisting with some parts manufacture for the 1044 gearbox, supplied in 2010 to three Formula One teams: Lotus, Virgin and HRT. This gearbox was mated to the Cosworth CA2010 engine.
Ricardo undertook an investigation on the behalf of SAIC into the Head gasket issues of the Rover K Series and to remedy the problems with engine. The improvements included a redesigned head and case, as well as changing the manufacturing process and quality of material. No head gasket issues have been recorded and thanks to Ricardo, the SAIC Kavachi is seen as the ultimate version of the Rover K Series.
Transmissions manufactured by Ricardo are used in the Jaguar XJ220, Ford GT, Aston Martin Valkyrie and the 270 Mph Hennessey Venom GT.

References

External links
Ricardo plc website
Ricardo Rail division website
Ricardo Extends DCT Production for Open-top Bugatti

Technology companies established in 1915
Companies based in Cambridge
Engineering consulting firms of the United Kingdom
International engineering consulting firms
Engine manufacturers of the United Kingdom
Automotive transmission makers
Automotive motorsports and performance companies
Auto parts suppliers of the United Kingdom
1915 establishments in England